is a railway station in the city of Ichinomiya, Aichi Prefecture, Japan, operated by Meitetsu.

Lines
Imaise Station is served by the Meitetsu Nagoya Main Line and is 88.3 kilometers from the terminus of the line at Toyohashi Station.

Station layout
The station has two opposed side platforms connected by a  footbridge. The station has automated ticket machines, Manaca automated turnstiles and is unattended.

Platforms

Adjacent stations

Station history
Imaise Station was opened on April 29, 1935.

Passenger statistics
In fiscal 2013, the station was used by an average of 2905 passengers daily.

Surrounding area
 Imaise Cardiac Center
 Japan Wool Textile Industry Co Ltd Ichinomiya plant

See also
 List of Railway Stations in Japan

References

External links

 Official web page 

Railway stations in Japan opened in 1935
Railway stations in Aichi Prefecture
Stations of Nagoya Railroad
Ichinomiya, Aichi